This is a list of Odia language authors.

A
 Santanu Kumar Acharya
 Achyutananda
 Akshaya Mohanty

B
 Baidyanath Misra
 Upendra Bhanja
 Bhima Bhoi
 Birendra Kumar Bhuyan

C
 Mrinal Chatterjee

D
 Jagannath Prasad Das
 Manoj Das
 Manoranjan Das
 Sarala Das

F
 Faturananda

K
 Krushna Chandra Kar

M
 Bhupen Mahapatra
 Gokulananda Mahapatra
 Sitakant Mahapatra
 Harekrushna Mahatab
 Mayadhar Mansingh
 Tarun Kanti Mishra
 Artaballabha Mohanty
 Akshaya Mohanty
 Durga Charan Mohanty
 Gopinath Mohanty
 Jagadish Mohanty
 Kanhu Charan Mohanty
 Surendra Mohanty
 Bibhuprasad Mohapatra
 Kumudini Mohapatra

N
 Nanda Kishore Bal

P
 Kalindi Charan Panigrahi
 Krishna Chandra Panigrahi
 Nikhilanand Panigrahy
 Ramesh Chandra Parida
 Bibhuti Patnaik
 Manasi Pradhan
 Tapan Kumar Pradhan
 Gopala Chandra Praharaj
 Pyarimohan Acharya

R
 Gopal Rath
 Brajanath Ratha
 Annada Shankar Ray
 Pratibha Ray
 Sachidananda Routray

S
 Mohapatra Nilamani Sahoo
 Sarojini Sahoo
 Laxminarayan Sahu
 Natabar Samantaray
 Nandini Satpathy
 Fakir Mohan Senapati
 Amos Sutton
 Mayadhar Swain
 Puripanda Appala Swamy

U
 Srinibash Udgata

See also
Odia literature
Odia language

Lists of writers by language